Pre-Electric Wizard 1989–1994 is a compilation of songs featuring Electric Wizard frontman Jus Oborn with his previous band, which changed its name twice.

Songs 1-4 are by Eternal, from the demo Lucifer's Children (1993).
Songs 5-7 are by Thy Grief Eternal, from the demo On Blackened Wings (1992).
Songs 8-11 are by Lord of Putrefaction, from the split LP with Mortal Remains on Dave Gedge's Nuclear Gore Records (1991).

The Eternal material was also released as Lucifer's Children by Rise Above on 10" vinyl. The Thy Grief Eternal material was also released on 10" vinyl by Rise Above under the title On Blackened Wings. The Lord of Putrefaction split LP is now out of print.

The first seven songs (along with two unknown jams) were given out on a CD by The Music Cartel during the late 1990s to promote Electric Wizard.

History 

This CD traces the origins of one of the most important bands to evolve from the UK heavy underground, Electric Wizard. Initially formed in the unlikely setting of Wimborne, Dorset the first known incarnation to feature Electric Wizard main man, Justin Oborn went under the moniker,  Lord of Putrefaction. Inspired by the popular bands of the time; Carcass, Celtic Frost, Slayer, Bolt Thrower, Napalm Death etc. the band members also had deep rooted connections in the underground tape trading scene. Following the recording of their 1989 demo, Necromantic, word about the band spread internationally.
Then followed the release of the band's one and only vinyl venture, which came in the form of a self-produced split album with Mortal Remains on Nuclear Gore Records. This was the label founded by bassist Dave Gedge, who also ran a magazine of the same name. He remained a key member of the various bands leading up to the formation of Electric Wizard and later went on to publish his own magazine & record label, Bad Acid. The recording from that split has now been remastered for inclusion here, with original copies now being extremely hard to find.

Following the recording of the split, a notable change was beginning to occur in the band's musical approach. They began to play a lot slower, displaying obvious influences from cult bands such as Winter and Melvins. This had been noted by friend Lee Dorrian who used to write to various members of the band. He heard a rehearsal tape from that time and became interested in working with them on his label, Rise Above Records. This would become the
start of a working relationship which has survived until the present day. By June 1991, after a couple of line-up changes the band had decided to change their name to the more morose sounding Thy Grief Eternal.

After playing a show with Cathedral at London's prestigious Marquee Club, Dorrian paid for them to go into the studio to record some tracks (included here) for initial inclusion on the second instalment of Doom Metal compilation, Dark Passages. Due to timing problems, this didn't happen. The alternative idea was to put out the recording as a 12" EP, an idea which was rejected by the label's distributors in favour of waiting for a full-length album, which never saw the light of day. One of the main reasons for this was due to the band's ever developing sound and by 1993 they had again changed their name to the abbreviated & less deathly sounding Eternal.

By now the band was displaying a much more 70s-inspired doom sound and after more key London shows with Cathedral, they began to headline shows alongside up and coming new UK Doom bands such as Solstice and Mourn. In summer 1993 the band recorded their now legendary demo, featured on this CD, which again was initially intended for a vinyl release.

This line up did not last too long after the recording was made, mainly due to the fact that long-time bassist and associate, Dave Gedge moved to Sherborne. Meanwhile, Justin already had other plans and started to work on a project called Doom Chapter, with new accomplices Mark Greening & Tim Bagshaw. This line up would later become better known as Electric Wizard.

Track listing 
Lucifer's Children demo (1993)
 "Magickal Childe" – 6:02
 "Electric Funeral" (Black Sabbath) – 4:29
 "Lucifer's Children" – 9:47
 "Chrono.Naut (Phase I-IV)" – 16:01
From the On Blackened Wings demo (1992)
 "Swathed in Black" – 6:59
 "On Blackened Wings" – 8:46
 "Outro" – 1:22
Lord of Putrefaction / Mortal Remains (1991)
 "Descent" – 3:48
 "Wings Over a Black Funeral" – 4:47
 "At the Cemetery Gates" – 6:05
 "Dark Prayers" – 5:07

Personnel

Lord of Putrefaction (1991) 
Jus Oborn – electric guitar, vocals
Adam Richardson – electric guitar, vocals
Dave Gedge – bass guitar
James Evans – drums

Thy Grief Eternal (1992) 
Jus Oborn – electric guitar, vocals
Adam Richardson – electric guitar, vocals
Dave Gedge – bass guitar
James Evans – drums

Eternal (1993) 
Jus Oborn – electric guitar, vocals
Gavin Gillingham – electric guitar
Dave Gedge – bass guitar
Gareth Brunsdon – drums

References 

Electric Wizard albums
Rise Above Records albums
2006 compilation albums
Candlelight Records albums